Agnew Airport  is an airport in Mapoon, Shire of Cook, Queensland, Australia. It presumably takes its name from the parish.

Facilities

See also
 List of airports in Queensland

References

Airports in Queensland
Shire of Cook